The Shapley–Sawyer Concentration Class is a classification system on a scale of one to twelve using Roman numerals for globular clusters according to their concentration. The most highly concentrated clusters such as M75 are classified as Class I, with successively diminishing concentrations ranging to Class XII, such as Palomar 12. (The class is sometimes given with numbers [Class 1–12] rather than with Roman numerals.)

History 
From 1927–1929, Harlow Shapley and Helen Sawyer Hogg began categorizing clusters according to the degree of concentration the system has toward the core using this scale. This became known as the Shapley–Sawyer Concentration Class.

Classes

References 

Astronomical classification systems